Turrancilla akontistes is a species of sea snail, a marine gastropod mollusk in the family Ancillariidae.

Distribution
This species occurs in the Indian Ocean off Mozambique.

References

Ancillariidae
Gastropods described in 1980